The Minister of State at the Department of the Environment, Climate and Communications is a junior ministerial post in the Department of the Environment, Climate and Communications of the Government of Ireland who may perform functions delegated by the Minister for the Environment, Climate and Communications. A Minister of State does not hold cabinet rank.

There are currently two Ministers of State:
Jack Chambers, TD, with special responsibility for Postal Policy.
Ossian Smyth, TD, with special responsibility for Communications and Circular Economy.

List of Parliamentary Secretaries

List of Ministers of State

References

Environment
Department of the Environment, Climate and Communications